The Men's 20 kilometre individual biathlon competition at the 1972 Winter Olympics was held on 9 February, at Makomanai Biathlon Site.  Each miss of the target cost two minutes, while hitting the outer circle cost one minute.

Summary 

Alexander Tikhonov and Dieter Speer, who between them had the last three world titles, were two of the fastest skiers, but neither managed to medal; Speer took seven minutes of penalties to put himself out of contention, and Tikhonov was unable to recover from three penalties on the first shoot, as he managed to get back to 4th place, but finished more than twenty seconds clear of the medalists. The winner was the defending Olympic champion Magnar Solberg. Solberg led early, and limited his penalties to only two, one of the better rounds of the day. Silver went to Hansjörg Knauthe, who was one of only two men to receive only one shooting penalty. Lars-Göran Arwidson took bronze, holding off Tikhonov by 30 seconds. Finland's Esko Saira skied even quicker than Tikhonov, but had five minutes in penalties, and ended up 6th.

Solberg remains the only champion to defend his title.

Results
Penalties refer to minutes added, as described above, not (necessarily) number of targets missed.

References

Individual